Douglass High School is a public secondary school in Douglass, Kansas, United States.  It is located at 910 East 1st Street, and operated by Douglass USD 396 public school district. The Douglass High School mascot is the bulldog and the school's colors are purple and gold.

See also
 List of high schools in Kansas
 List of unified school districts in Kansas

References

External links
 School website

Public high schools in Kansas
Schools in Butler County, Kansas